The Botswana Vaccine Institute Staff Union (BVSU) is a trade union affiliate of the Botswana Federation of Trade Unions in Botswana.

References
 
 

Botswana Federation of Trade Unions
Vaccination-related organizations
Organisations based in Gaborone
Healthcare trade unions in Botswana